The Axelrod quartet is a set of four Stradivarius instruments collected by Herbert R. Axelrod. The collection consists of the Greffuhle violin, Axelrod viola, Ole Bull violin, and Marylebone cello.

In 1997, Axelrod donated them to the Smithsonian Institution. Their value at the time was estimated at $50 million.

The Axelrod quartet is sometimes played. Another cello, the Servais Stradivarius, which is also in the Smithsonian's collection, is occasionally added to the Axelrod quartet in concert.

References

External links
The Axelrod String Quartet

Stradivari sets
String instruments
Artifacts in the collection of the Smithsonian Institution